The following is a list of leaders of Communist Tuva, encompassing leaders of the Tuvan People's Republic, the Tuvan Autonomous Oblast (the Tuvan AO) and the Tuvan Autonomous Soviet Socialist Republic (the Tuvan ASSR).

It lists heads of state, heads of government, heads of the Tuvan People's Revolutionary Party and of the local branch of the Communist Party of the Soviet Union.

The Tuvan People's Republic was nominally a sovereign state in 1921–44, but it was considered a satellite state of the Soviet Union (the Soviet Union and the Mongolian People's Republic were the only countries to recognize its independence).

In 1944, at the request of Tuva's Small People's Khural (parliament), the Tuvan People's Republic became a part of the Soviet Union as an autonomous oblast (the Tuvan AO) of the Russian Soviet Federative Socialist Republic (the Russian SFSR) by the decision of Presidium of the Supreme Soviet of the USSR.

In 1961, the Tuvan AO became an autonomous soviet socialist republic (the Tuvan ASSR) of the Russian SFSR.

Tuvan People's Republic

Heads of state

Heads of government

Heads of party

Heads of finance ministry
Sodnam Oorjak, 1928-1930
Tanchai Oyun, 1932-1934
Polat Oyun, 1933-1937
Nikolay Tovarishtay, 1940-1941
Shamir Erectol, 1941-1943
Kenden Lopsan, 1943-1944

Tuvan Autonomous Oblast / Tuvan Autonomous Soviet Socialist Republic

Heads of state

Heads of government

Heads of party

See also
 Chairman of the Government of Tuva
 History of Tuva
 Tuvan People's Republic
 1929 Tuvan coup d'état
 Tuvan Autonomous Oblast
 Tuvan Autonomous Soviet Socialist Republic

References

Sources
 World Statesmen.org (for the Tuvan Socialist Republic)
 World Statesmen.org (for the Tuvan AO and the Tuvan ASSR)

Tuva communist leaders
Tuva communist leaders
Tuva Head of State
Communist Tuva
Communist Tuva
Politics of the Soviet Union